The women's long jump event  at the 2002 European Athletics Indoor Championships was held on March 3.

Results

References
Results

Long jump at the European Athletics Indoor Championships
Long
2002 in women's athletics